Stadia marks, also called stadia lines or stadia hairs, are crosshairs on the reticle of a theodolite or other surveying instrument that allow stadiametric rangefinding.

Etymology
The term stadia mark derives from the obsolete unit of distance, the stadion, derived from the Greek measurement of a stadium. Several different stadia were defined, such as the Greek stadion and Egyptian stadion.

Usage

A typical surveyor's instrument reticle has two pairs of stadia marks. One pair are on the horizontal centreline and the other on the vertical cross hair. Each functions in the same manner and are placed for measuring on either axis.

The stadia marks are set a specific length apart. This length is chosen so that there is a fixed, integer ratio between the difference of the  rod readings and the distance from the telescope to the rod. This ratio is known as the stadia constant or stadia interval factor. Thus the formula for distance is

  

where

  
  
  

For example, a typical stadia mark pair are set so that the ratio is 100. If one observes a vertical length on a stadia rod, rule or levelling rod with the telescope and sees that the rod spans 0.500 m between the marks (the stadia interval), then the horizontal distance from the instrument to the rod is:
 0.500m x 100 = 50 m.

In the adjacent image, the upper stadia mark is at 1.500 m and the lower at 1.345 m. The difference is 0.155 m. Thus the distance from the instrument to the levelling rod is:
 0.155 x 100 = 15.5 m.

See also
Stadiametric rangefinding
Tacheometry
Theodolite
Dumpy level
Plane table
Levelling rod

References

Sources
Raymond Davis, Francis Foote, Joe Kelly, Surveying, Theory and Practice, McGraw-Hill Book Company, 1966 LC 64-66263

Measuring instruments
Surveying